Novaya Sluda is a rural locality (a village) in Dvinitskoye Rural Settlement, Syamzhensky District, Vologda Oblast, Russia. The population was 20 as of 2002.

Geography 
Novaya Sluda is located 50 km northeast of Syamzha (the district's administrative centre) by road. Srednyaya Sluda is the nearest rural locality.

References 

Rural localities in Syamzhensky District